William Henson Wallace (July 19, 1811 – February 7, 1879) was an important figure in the early histories of two U.S. states, serving as governor and Congressional delegate from both Washington Territory and Idaho Territory.

Biography
Wallace was born July 19, 1811, near Troy, Ohio.  He attended in the common schools of Indiana, studied law, was admitted to the bar and began practicing law.  He married Luzanne Brazelton and had three children, two girls who died in infancy and one son. 
Wallace's older brother David Wallace served as a Whig Governor of Indiana from 1837 to 1840. Wallace's nephew was Lew Wallace, a Civil War Union general and the author of Ben-Hur.

Career
After being admitted to the bar, Wallace moved to the Iowa District of Wisconsin Territory in 1837. He was elected to the Iowa Territorial Legislature as a Whig after Iowa Territory was organized the following year. Despite a Democratic majority in the body, Wallace secured eleven of twenty votes for the speakership. Wallace was appointed colonel of state troops and receiver of public money at Fairfield. Wallace ran an unsuccessful campaign for delegate from Iowa Territory in 1843. In 1848, he was a candidate for United States Senate from the new State of Iowa, but the Iowa Legislature instead selected Democrats George Wallace Jones and Augustus C. Dodge. Wallace moved to Washington Territory in 1853.  Sometime during the early 1850s, he befriended Abraham Lincoln and they remained good friends until Lincoln's death.

In 1861, Wallace was appointed governor of Washington Territory by President Lincoln, but was also elected the territory's delegate to the United States House of Representatives and never took office as governor. He was the first Republican chosen for those roles in Washington Territory.  Wallace served a single term representing Washington Territory in the House.  During his term, he got Congress to establish Idaho as a territory.  Shortly after his term expired in March 1863, Lincoln appointed Wallace governor of the new Idaho Territory and he took office July 10, 1863.

Wallace designated Lewiston as the territory's capital and arrived there in July. Later that year, Wallace was elected as the delegate from Idaho Territory and again vacated his gubernatorial appointment to serve in the House.

Wallace is reported to have been one of several people who turned down an invitation from Lincoln to accompany him to Ford's Theatre on the night Lincoln was assassinated.

Death
After his term expired in March 1865, Wallace returned to Washington Territory where he served as a probate judge in Pierce County until his death in 1879. Wallace is buried in Fort Steilacoom Cemetery, Steilacoom, Pierce County, Washington, United States.

References

External links

 Available online through the Washington State Library's Classics in Washington History collection

William Henson Wallace entry at The Political Graveyard

The Mossback Tripod
Idaho State Historical Society

1811 births
1879 deaths
People from Troy, Ohio
People from Steilacoom, Washington
Members of the Iowa Territorial Legislature
Delegates to the United States House of Representatives from Idaho Territory
Delegates to the United States House of Representatives from Washington Territory
People of Washington (state) in the American Civil War
People of Idaho in the American Civil War
Governors of Idaho Territory
Governors of Washington Territory
Iowa Whigs
Idaho Republicans
Washington (state) Republicans
19th-century American politicians
Probate court judges in the United States